Kalyanam is a 2018 Malayalam romantic-comedy film written and directed by Rajesh Nair. It stars newcomers Varsha Bollamma and Shravan Mukesh, son of the Malayalam film actor, Mukesh. The film was released on 23 February 2018.

Plot
Sarath, the only son of Prabhakaran is madly in love with his childhood friend Shari, the only daughter of their neighbor Sahadevan Nair. As they grow up it becomes difficult for Sarath to somehow convey his feelings to her, despite both of them meeting frequently. Moreover, Shari's dad wants to marry her off to a "Nair" boy according to their tradition. Sarath is always accompanied by his friend Saiju and his too young uncle Avesh. They spend most of the day at a garage owned by Sundaran. Sarath observes that Varkey, an aged worker in the garage is often visited by a drunkard man who keeps coming to the garage for the sake of scolding Varkey, who always gives a deaf ear to it. No one knows the reason or relation between them.

Later, Shari's parents arrange a bridegroom for her which saddens Sarath which leads to comical situations. It ends up with the three of them being caught by the police, though released later. Varkey is again scolded by the drunken man, and Sarath asks him why he is scolded. Varkey reveals that the drunken man was the one who liked Varkey's daughter a lot, and wanted to marry her. But Varkey objected, due to the guy being from a different religion. He also marries the girl off to a suitable family. But the girl got killed few days later, thus saddening both Varkey and the man.

Hearing the story and also witnessing Shari accompanying her would-be home, Sarath is disheartened and attempts suicide by standing on a railway track. But he is stopped by his parents, and he discloses about his love to them for the first time. Prabhakaran says that they would have arranged for it had he told about it earlier. Now that it is too late, Sarath is advised by his father to forget everything. While at Shari's home on the day before the marriage, he unintentionally goes to Shari's room, where he sees objects from their childhood which she preserved. Upon meeting her, she confesses to him that she liked him a lot since childhood, but didn't talk about it as he apparently showed no interest. Now that both of them had confessed their liking for each other, Shari says its too late for both of them. She says it was Sarath's father who disapproved their marriage. Sarath meets Sahadevan, who makes it clear that he wasn't interested in their relationship right from their childhood, so he was the one who lied to her.

Knowing all these, Prabhakaran decides to confront Sahadevan who brutally rejected his son. After Prabhakaran enters Sahadevan's room, Sarath's friends eagerly wait outside and see Prabhakaran coming out after sometime. He asks Sarath to be ready for his marriage the next day. The next day, to everyone's surprise, Sarath marries Shari in the same planned time. Sarath and his friends are eager to know how Prabhakaran made things possible. He reveals that it was Shari's master plan, by faking a suicide attempt if Sahadevan doesn't allow her marriage with Sarath. Thus Sarath realises how much Shari loves him, and confesses that his feelings were nothing before that of her.

Cast

Shravan Mukesh as Sarath
 Mukesh as K.P. Sahadevan Nair
 Sreenivasan as Prabhakaran
 Varsha Bollamma as Shari
 Parvathi T as Suma
 Jacob Gregory as Saiju
 Hareesh Kanaran as Aveesh Kumar
 Pradeep Kottayam as Aravindan
 Dharmajan Bolgatty as Sundaran
 Sudheer Karamana as police officer
 Asha Aravind as Rukmini
 Dharmajyothis Manoj as young Sarath
 Dharmathejas Manoj as teenager sarath
 Parvadhy as young Shari
 Sanjana as teenager Shari
 Saiju Kurup as Kishor
 Indrans as Varkey
 S.P. Sreekumar as Jimmy
 Narayanankutty as Ramanan
 Chembil Ashokan as Moideen
 Anu as Ummakolus
 Manju Sunichen as Rama
 Saju Navodaya as Velladi
 Anil Nedumangad as Cameo appearance
 Sasi Kalinga as Cameo appearance

Music 
The film's soundtrack and score is composed by Prakash Alex and sung by Najim Arshad and Siddharth Menon, Also the viral song Drithangapulakitha song rendered by Dulquer Salmaan and Jacob Gregory.  The team have organized an under water audio launch for the movie at Kovalam beach in Thiruvananthapuram on February 6.

Release 
The Times of India gave the film a rating of two-and-a-half out of five stars and wrote that "The fact that the director has chosen to infuse the film with clichés can still be pushed to the backseat, had there been an element of novelty that would trigger some curiosity among the audience". Manorama Online gave the film the same review and praised the performances of the lead cast.

References 

2010s Malayalam-language films
Indian romantic comedy films
Films shot in Thiruvananthapuram
2018 films
2018 romantic comedy films
Films directed by Rajesh Nair